USS Noble may refer to the following vessels operated by the United States Navy:

, part of the Stone Fleet in 1862
, acquired by the US Navy in 1944 and transferred to Spain in 1964

United States Navy ship names